Umuarama Esporte Clube is a football club in the city of Iporá, in the state of Goiás that competes in the third division of Campeonato Goiano.

History
Founded on November 15, 1965 in the city of Iporá in the state of Goiás, the club is affiliated to Federação Goiana de Futebol and has played in Campeonato Goiano (Second Division) five times and Third Division seven times.

References 

Association football clubs established in 1965
Football clubs in Goiás